Ralph J. DeBerardinis is an American physician-scientist, the chief of the Division of Pediatric Genetics and Metabolism at the Children’s Medical Center Research Institute at UT Southwestern and a professor at the University of Texas Southwestern Medical Center. DeBerardinis became a Howard Hughes Medical Institute Investigator in 2018. DeBerardinis was elected to the National Academy of Medicine in 2020. DeBerardinis is known for his contributions to research on cancer and pediatric inborn errors of metabolism.

Biography 
DeBerardinis was born and raised in the Philadelphia area. DeBerardinis received a Bachelor of Science (BS) degree from St. Joseph’s University and M.D. and Ph.D. degrees from the University of Pennsylvania. DeBerardinis completed his Ph.D. in the laboratory of Haig H. Kazazian Jr. DeBerardinis was an inaugural trainee of the combined Pediatrics/Genetics Residency program at The Children’s Hospital of Philadelphia (CHOP). DeBerardinis has achieved board certifications in clinical biochemical genetics, medical genetics, and pediatrics. DeBerardinis performed his postdoctoral research in the laboratory of Craig Thompson while he was at the Penn Cancer Center. After completing his postdoctoral work, DeBerardinis opened his own research laboratory in 2008 at University of Texas Southwestern Medical Center. 

DeBerardinis has been on the Scientific Advisory Boards of several companies, including Agios Pharmaceuticals, Peloton Therapeutics, and Vida Ventures. As of April 2022, DeBerardinis has authored over 350 publications and has an h-index of 94.

Scientific contributions 
DeBerardinis is well known for his use of isotope-tracing metabolomics to identify how tumors utilize different nutrients. Using genomics and metabolomics approaches, DeBerardinis also has worked to identify novel mutations that affect the activity of metabolic enzymes.

Selected awards and honors 

 2017 Outstanding Investigator Award, National Cancer Institute
 2018 Howard Hughes Medical Institute Investigator
 2019 TAMEST Edith and Peter O'Donnell Award in Medicine
 2020 National Academy of Medicine
 2021 Paul Marks Prize for Cancer Research

Selected publications 

 Mullen, A. R., Wheaton, W. W., Jin, E. S., Chen, P. H., Sullivan, L. B., Cheng, T., Yang, Y., Linehan, W. M., Chandel, N. S., & DeBerardinis, R. J. (2011). Reductive carboxylation supports growth in tumour cells with defective mitochondria. Nature, 481(7381), 385–388. https://doi.org/10.1038/nature10642
 Marin-Valencia, I., Yang, C., Mashimo, T., Cho, S., Baek, H., Yang, X. L., Rajagopalan, K. N., Maddie, M., Vemireddy, V., Zhao, Z., Cai, L., Good, L., Tu, B. P., Hatanpaa, K. J., Mickey, B. E., Matés, J. M., Pascual, J. M., Maher, E. A., Malloy, C. R., Deberardinis, R. J., Bachoo, R. M. (2012). Analysis of tumor metabolism reveals mitochondrial glucose oxidation in genetically diverse human glioblastomas in the mouse brain in vivo. Cell metabolism, 15(6), 827–837. https://doi.org/10.1016/j.cmet.2012.05.001
 Tasdogan, A., Faubert, B., Ramesh, V., Ubellacker, J. M., Shen, B., Solmonson, A., Murphy, M. M., Gu, Z., Gu, W., Martin, M., Kasitinon, S. Y., Vandergriff, T., Mathews, T. P., Zhao, Z., Schadendorf, D., DeBerardinis, R. J., & Morrison, S. J. (2020). Metabolic heterogeneity confers differences in melanoma metastatic potential. Nature, 577(7788), 115–120. https://doi.org/10.1038/s41586-019-1847-2
 Hensley, C. T., Faubert, B., Yuan, Q., Lev-Cohain, N., Jin, E., Kim, J., Jiang, L., Ko, B., Skelton, R., Loudat, L., Wodzak, M., Klimko, C., McMillan, E., Butt, Y., Ni, M., Oliver, D., Torrealba, J., Malloy, C. R., Kernstine, K., Lenkinski, R. E., … DeBerardinis, R. J. (2016). Metabolic Heterogeneity in Human Lung Tumors. Cell, 164(4), 681–694. https://doi.org/10.1016/j.cell.2015.12.034
 Faubert, B., Li, K. Y., Cai, L., Hensley, C. T., Kim, J., Zacharias, L. G., Yang, C., Do, Q. N., Doucette, S., Burguete, D., Li, H., Huet, G., Yuan, Q., Wigal, T., Butt, Y., Ni, M., Torrealba, J., Oliver, D., Lenkinski, R. E., Malloy, C. R., … DeBerardinis, R. J. (2017). Lactate Metabolism in Human Lung Tumors. Cell, 171(2), 358–371.e9. https://doi.org/10.1016/j.cell.2017.09.019

References 

Physician-scientists
21st-century American physicians
20th-century American physicians
Cancer researchers
American medical researchers
University of Texas at Dallas faculty
Members of the National Academy of Medicine
Saint Joseph's University alumni
Perelman School of Medicine at the University of Pennsylvania alumni
Year of birth missing (living people)
Living people